Bold They Rise: The Space Shuttle Early Years (1972-1986) is a 2014 non-fiction book by David Hitt and Heather R. Smith. Bold They Rise tells the story of the Space Shuttle through the personal experiences of the astronauts, engineers, and scientists who made it happen—in space and on the ground, from the days of research and design through the heroic accomplishments of the program to the tragic last minutes of the Space Shuttle Challenger disaster.

The book is part of the Outward Odyssey spaceflight history series by the University of Nebraska Press.

The book title is based on a poem by space historian Colin Burgess.

External links
 Bold They Rise Official Publisher Site
 Book review by Jeff Foust of The Space Review 
 Book review by Emily Carney for America Space

2014 non-fiction books
Spaceflight books
University of Nebraska Press books